The Chamber Music Society of Lower Basin Street is a musical variety radio program which began on the Blue Network on February 11, 1940. 
 		
The program was created and hosted by NBC staff announcer Gene Hamilton, as a tongue-in-cheek satire of highbrow symphonic broadcasts hosted by Milton Cross. Instead of Cross's dignified commentary introducing each orchestral selection, "Dr. Gino Hamilton" would introduce a traditional hot-jazz (dixieland) melody, peppering his remarks with slang.
 		
The music was performed by two house bands. Henry Levine, a former member of the Original Dixieland Jazz Band, led an eight-member dixieland combo; Paul Laval (later Lavalle) led a 10-piece woodwind ensemble, with arrangements employing oboe, bassoon, and French horn. Each broadcast featured a vocalist: Dinah Shore was discovered on the Basin Street program; she was succeeded in turn by New York-based vocalists Diane Courtney, Dodie O'Neill, Dixie Mason, Linda Keene, Loulie Jean Norman, and Lena Horne.
 		
Gene Hamilton invited guest artists to appear on Lower Basin Street, including Benny Goodman, Count Basie, W. C. Handy, Bobby Hackett, Lead Belly, Lionel Hampton, Jelly Roll Morton, Sidney Bechet, and Alec Templeton, among other famous names in the jazz world. Many leading musicians were fans of the show, and kept in touch with Hamilton by telephone to arrange guest shots.
 		
The Chamber Music Society of Lower Basin Street began as a sustaining (unsponsored) half-hour feature on NBC's Sunday-afternoon schedule (4:30 p.m. Eastern time). So many listeners wrote to the network expressing approval -- and asking to see the show in person -- that in October 1940 NBC gave Lower Basin Street a Monday-evening slot in its primetime schedule. Fans protested vigorously when the network sometimes pre-empted the program and even announced plans to cancel it. As Variety commented: "NBC has twice decided to fold the series, but each time has continued it in response to listener agitation." Hamilton mentioned this off-again, on-again status on the air: "Greetings, music lovers, and if we've been canceled again and you're not hearing this, please don't tell us." Hamilton was forced to leave the program in late 1941, when NBC reassigned him to its production department. He was replaced as host by announcer Jack McCarthy and then by the very man the series was burlesquing, Milton Cross. 

After two years of running as a sustaining show, Lower Basin Street found a sponsor: the Andrew Jergens Company, manufacturer of health and beauty aids. With a budget enhanced by Jergens, the program could now afford more "name" guest stars. The format drifted away from Hamilton's original, intimate concept of hot-jazz jam sessions and became a brassy big-band jamboree staged for large crowds. The Jergens advertising agency Lennen & Mitchell kept tampering with the format, and the program took a sharp nosedive. As Billboard reported during the show's last weeks: "It is said that the show, which has had several format changes in the past year, is a dead duck. The show had a high Hooper [rating] as a sustainer, but failed to come thru once it went commercial and the basic idea, hot jazz and sophisticated comedy, was junked. Many program men say that if the show had been left as it was, a lively session of hot jazz, it would have stayed up with the leaders." The show left the air in October 1944.
 		
When dixieland music became a nationwide craze in 1950, NBC returned The Chamber Music Society of Lower Basin Street to its schedule on June 8 of that year, with "Dr. Gino" Hamilton returning to the microphone. The series aired as a summer replacement for Judy Canova's program. 

NBC looked to its established radio properties for possible conversion to television series, and The Chamber Music Society of Lower Basin Street was on the list. To gauge public interest, Lower Basin Street was revived as a Saturday-night radio series during the spring of 1952, with Henry Levine's band, vocalist Martha Lou Harp, and a new host, 23-year-old nightclub comedian Orson Bean. Bean caught the spirit of the series immediately, and read the scripted remarks and puns in the bemused tones of a stuffy college professor. (Questioning the inclusion of a saxophone in an arrangement, Dr. Bean muttered, "Is sax necessary?") NBC staff announcer Wayne Howell, in the same spirit, introduced the host as "Boston's half-baked Bean." The series, which debuted on April 12, 1952, did well enough for NBC to mount a live-TV special on June 15 -- 5:30 on Sunday afternoon -- with Bean, Levine, Harp, guest commentator Arthur Treacher, hot bagpiper Ross Gorman, and dancers Milton Kanen and Gene Myers. No kinescope recordings of the show are known to survive, and the special was not picked up as a series. The Lower Basin Street franchise came to an end.

In 1953 Gene Hamilton, the originator of the show, returned to NBC with his own hot-jazz radio program, Dr. Gino, airing on Saturday afternoons.

Recordings and films

Beginning in November 1940, RCA Victor recorded albums featuring The Chamber Music Society of Lower Basin Street. The liner notes were written by Welbourne (Web) Kelley, who wrote the radio series. Each disc in the album would begin with "Dr. Gino" Hamilton introducing the selection, played by one of the two Lower Basin Street bands. The other side of the disc featured the other band. RCA re-released these records as late as the 1960s, emphasizing vocalists Dinah Shore or Lena Horne and deleting the commentaries.
 		
The only surviving visual records of The Chamber Music Society of Lower Basin Street are four three-minute films produced for the Soundies film jukeboxes in 1941. All feature the Henry Levine "Dixieland Jazz Band," with vocals by Linda Keene in three of them.

References

Listen to
 Five full episodes of The Chamber Music Society of Lower Basin Street

External links
Joe Mosbrook's Jazzed in Cleveland

1940s American radio programs
American jazz radio programs
NBC Blue Network radio programs
1940 radio programme debuts